Giovanni Doria (24 March 1573, Genoa – Palermo, Sicily, 19 October 1642),  called Giannettino, the son of Giovanni Andrea Doria, 6th Prince of Melfi, and Princess Zenobia Doria del Carretto, 5th Princess of Melfi.

Biography
Doria studied philosophy and theology in Spain being promoted to the Cardinalate at the instance of King Felipe II of Spain. Once king Philip II died, he was created cardinal deacon, aged 31, in the consistory of 9 June 1604. Doria was granted permission to receive the sacred orders outside the Ember days on 9 December 1604. He participated in both the March–April 1605 papal conclave, which elected Pope Leo XI, and in the May 1605 papal conclave, which elected Pope Paul V.

Doria received the red hat, the deaconry of S. Adriano, on 5 December 1605 and the position of Abbot commendatario of San Fruttuoso in Camogli. He was elected titular archbishop of Thessalonica and named coadjutor, with right of succession, of Palermo, on 4 February 1608. He was consecrated on 4 May 1608, at Rome, by Pope Paul V.

He succeeded to the see of Palermo, Sicily on 5 July 1608. He served as Viceroy of Sicily and lieutenant of the king of Spain from 8 February 1610 to March 1611, July to August 1616, from 1 August 1624 to 1626 and from 1639 to June 1641.

Doria participated in the 1621 papal conclave, which elected Pope Gregory XV. He next participated in the 1623 papal conclave, which elected Pope Urban VIII. On 2 October 1623 Doria opted for the order of cardinal priests and the title of San Pietro in Montorio, 

He celebrated the discovery of the relics of Saint Rosalia, and promoted her cult as patroness and protector of Palermo.

He died on 19 November 1642 in Palermo and was buried in the chapel of S. Rosalia, in the metropolitan cathedral of Palermo.

While bishop, he was the principal consecrator of Manuel Esteban Muniera, Bishop of Cefalù (1621).

Sources

Cardella, Lorenzo. Memorie storiche de' cardinali della Santa Romana Chiesa. Rome : Stamperia Pagliarini, 1793, VI, 113-115
 Gauchat,Patritium. Hierarchia Catholica Medii et Recentioris Aevi'', Münster : Sumptibus et Typis Librariae Regensbergianae, 1935; reprint, Padua : Il Messagero di S. Antonio, 1960, IV, 8, 47, 50, 272 and 335.

1573 births
1642 deaths
16th-century Genoese people
17th-century Genoese people
16th-century Italian nobility
17th-century Italian nobility
17th-century Italian Roman Catholic archbishops
17th-century viceregal rulers
Clergy from Genoa
Giovanni
Viceroys of Sicily
Burials at Palermo Cathedral
Roman Catholic archbishops of Palermo